C.C. Smith may refer to:

Charles C. Smith (boxer) (1860–1924), African American boxer
Cecil Clementi Smith (1840–1916), British colonial administrator
Cedric C. Smith (1895–1969), All-American football player for the University of Michigan and the Buffalo All-Americans
Charles C. Smith (Virginia politician), mayor of Newport News, Virginia, 1924–1926
Charles C. Smith (Pennsylvania politician) (1908–1970), Pennsylvania state representative
Christopher Corey Smith (born 1968), voice actor

See also
List of people with surname Smith